J. J. Smith is an Irish Gaelic footballer. From Rathvilly, County Carlow, he plays for the Carlow senior football team, and for his local club Rathvilly. He has won 3 Carlow Senior Football Championships with his club—in 2002, 2004 and 2009. He also played with the Carlow IT team during his college days.

References

External links
 http://www.hoganstand.com/Carlow/ArticleForm.aspx?ID=2423
 http://www.hoganstand.com/carlow/ArticleForm.aspx?ID=36971
 http://www.hoganstand.com/Carlow/ArticleForm.aspx?ID=119233

Year of birth missing (living people)
Living people
Carlow inter-county Gaelic footballers
Rathvilly Gaelic footballers
Alumni of Institute of Technology, Carlow